The March 26 Movement (Movimiento 26 de Marzo – M26)  is a Marxist–Leninist communist party in Uruguay, which emerged out the Tupamaros – National Liberation Movement. Since its foundation in 1971 until March 2008 was a member organisation of the BroadFront. After that the M26 founded a new party called "Asamblea Popular" (People's Assembly) in cooperation with other leftwing groups; nowadays that coalition is known as Popular Unity.

See also
 Popular Unity

References

External links
Official Website

Communist parties in Uruguay
Far-left politics in Uruguay
1971 establishments in Uruguay
Political parties established in 1971
Tupamaros